Jaramar Soto is a Mexican traditional singer, songwriter and painter.

Biography
From the age of 10 years Jaramar studied singing with various music teachers, and in 1966 entered the Mexican–American Cultural Exchange Institute in San Antonio, Texas. On her return to Mexico she entered the Mexican Academy of Dance, and also studied dance at the Academy of Coyoacán. Between 1972 and 1976, she studied Textile and Apparel Design in Rome at the Academia di Costume e di Moda and in Paris at the Ecole de la Chambre Syndicale of Couture Parisienne.

Since her return to Mexico, and until 1983, she worked in the area of clothing and textile design. Her professional activity is divided between her performance as a singer and her ongoing work in drawing, painting and sculpture.

Since 1978 she has lived in the city of Guadalajara. In 1990 she started a research project, recreation and music search which has been presented in different forums by Mexico and Europe.

Discography
 1992 Entre la pena y el gozo
 1995 Fingir que duermo
 1997 Si yo nunca muriera
 1998 Lenguas
 1999 A flor de tierra 2002 Nadie creera en incendio 2002 Journey (1992–2002)
 2004 Duerme por la noche oscura
 2006 Que mis labios te nombren
 2008 Diluvio
 2010 Ruta de viaje hacia un diluvio (DVD)
 2011 Fiestas privadas
 2013 "Rosa de los vientos (compilation)"
 2015 "El hilo invisible, cantos sefaradíes, con el Cuarteto Latinoamericano (*Latin Grammy winner 2016, for best music classical album)"
 2015 "Wait for the rain, con su trio de jazz Caída Libre"
 2017 "Sueños"

References
Jaramar Jaramar on rock.com.mx
Jaramar - Your Gateway to the World of Music Jaramar on World Music Central
Jaramar's Otherworldly Singing Is Transporting Los Angeles Times
Singer Jaramar Soto Puerto Vallarta, Mexico

External links
Official Page
Amazon- Jaramar Store
Jaramar on Rhapsody Music

1954 births
Living people
Mexican women singers
Zapotec-language singers
Singers from Mexico City
Singers from Guadalajara, Jalisco
Latin Grammy Award winners